The details of the 2009 All-Japan University Rugby Football Championships (全国大学ラグビーフットボール選手権大会 - Zenkoku Daigaku Ragubi- Futtobo-ru Senshuken Taikai)

Qualifiers 

 Top League Microsoft Cup Finalists - Toshiba Brave Lupus, Sanyo Wild Knights
 Top League Microsoft Cup Semi-Finalists - Suntory Sungoliath, Kobelco Steelers
 Top League 5th/6th - NEC Green Rockets, Kubota Spears
 All Japan University Rugby Championship - Teikyo University, Waseda University
 Japan Rugby Club Champion - Tamariba Club
 Top Challenger Series - Ricoh Black Rams

Knockout stages

First round 

Although Teikyo University and Ricoh Black Rams drew, due to tournament rules Ricoh Black Rams progresses due to scoring more tries (3 tries to 2).

Quarter-final

Semi-final

Final 

Suntory Sungoliath go through to the final automatically due to the withdrawal by Toshiba Brave Lupus. Christian Loamanu of Toshiba Brave Lupus tested positive for Cannabinoid, from a sample after a game against Suntory Sungoliath on 12 Jan 2008, in violation of the IRB Anti-Doping Regulation 21.2.1. Toshiba Brave Lupus decided that in the 'spirit of rugby values' to withdraw from the competition.

In this game Sanyo defeated Suntory for the second year in a row.

See also 
 Rugby union in Japan

All-Japan Rugby Football Championship
2008–09 in Japanese rugby union